Kottikkulam railway station  is a major railway station serving the town of Kottikulam in the Kasaragod District of Kerala, India.

Line 
It lies in the Shoranur–Mangalore section of the Southern Railway zone.

Infrastructure 
The station has two platforms and three tracks.

Services 
Trains from the station connect the town to prominent cities such as Thiruvananthapuram, Kochi, Chennai, Kollam, Kozhikode, Coimbatore and Mangalore.

References

External links
 

Railway stations in Kasaragod district
Palakkad railway division